The Guam Football Association Cup, better known as the Guam FA Cup, or officially the Beck's GFA Cup due to sponsorship reasons, is the national football domestic cup competition of Guam.

The competition has been administered by the Guam Football Association since its formation in 2008.

Cup History

2019 GFA Cup 
Champions: Bank of Guam Strykers FC

2nd Place: Rovers FC

Final score: 5–1

2018 GFA Cup
Champions: Bank of Guam Strykers FC

2nd Place: Rovers FC

Final score: 5–1

2017 GFA Cup
Champions: Guam Shipyard

2nd Place: Rovers FC

Final score: 4–1

2016 GFA Cup
Champions: Rovers FC

2nd Place: Guam Shipyard

Final score: 2–1

2015 GFA Cup

Champions: Guam Shipyard

2nd Place: Bank of Guam Strykers FC

Final score: 1–1 (aet, 5–3 pen)

2014 GFA Cup

Champions: Rovers FC

2nd Place: Espada

Final score: 4–3

2013 GFA Cup

Champions: Quality Distributors

2nd Place: Espada

3rd Place: Southern Cobras

Final score: 2–1

2012 GFA Cup

Champions: Guam Shipyard

2nd Place: Quality Distributors

3rd Place: Cars Plus FC

Final score: 4–3 [aet]

2011 Beck's GFA Cup

Champions: Quality Distributors

2nd Place: Cars Plus FC

3rd Place: MDA Cobras

Final score: 2–1 (QDFC – Scott Spindel 2; CPFC – own goal)

2010 Cars Plus GFA Cup

Champions: Guam Shipyard

2nd Place: Quality Distributors

3rd Place: Paintco Strykers

Final score: 4–3 (GSY – Jason Cunliffe 3, Elias Merfalen; QDFC – Scott Spindel 2, Jude Bischoff)

2009 Cars Plus GFA Cup

Champions: Quality Distributors

2nd Place: Guam Shipyard

3rd Place: No Ka Oi Guam SC

Final score: 3–1 AET (QDFC – Jude Bischoff, Seung Min Lee, Paul Long; GSY – own goal)

2008 Shirley's GFA Cup

Champions: Quality Distributors

2nd Place: IT&E Crushers

3rd Place: Paintco Strykers

Final score: 5–2 (QDFC: Francisco Santos 2, Jason Cunliffe, Jude Bischoff, Seung Min Lee; IT&E Eliseo Zamarron 2)

Sponsorship 
Since its formation, the competition has been given a title sponsor.  In its first season it was sponsored by Shirley's Restaurant, for the next two seasons by Cars Plus Guam and since 2010 by Beck's Brewery.

Performance by club

References

External links
Guam - List of Cup Winners, RSSSF.com

Football competitions in Guam
National association football cups
2008 establishments in Guam
Recurring sporting events established in 2008